The New York Sharks were a women's American football team that was based in New York City. Their final season in 2018 was played as a member team of the Women's Football Alliance (WFA).  They were the longest running and most winning team in women's football history with the honor of having a signed football in the Pro Football Hall of Fame.

Staff

Management Staff
 Owner – Andra Douglas
 CFO, Social Media Mgr, former VP of Operations - Dana Sparling
 General manager – Tia Hopkins
 VP - Crystal Turpin

The Final 2018 season Coaching staff: 
Head coach – Fabian Alesandro
Defensive coordinator – Kyle Copeland
Receivers Coach - Alan Walls
O-Line Coach - Yatia Hopkins
Defensive Backs Coach - Toni Salvatore
Quality Control - Pat Brown
Quarterbacks Coach - Fabian Baez

History

First full-contact game
The New Yorks Sharks originally started as a women's flag football team called the Long Island Sharks ran by Jacqueline Colon.  They played in international tournaments and were national champions.

In 1999, the Women's Professional Football League (WPFL) was formed. It consisted of two teams, the Minnesota Vixens and the Lake Michigan Minx. They traveled the country playing each other on what was called the "No Limits" Tour. They had heard about the success of the Long Island Sharks and challenged them to a full contact, tackle football game.

Jacqueline Colon accepted the challenge and with two months to prepare, converted her flag football team to a tackle football team. On Saturday, December 11, 1999, the Minnesota Vixens came to New York to take on the Sharks. The Vixens were favored having played 4 games already, having a 2–2 record.

The Sharks were coached by former New York Jet Bobby Jackson. Before 300 fans on a windy day at Mitchel Field, Long Island Sharks surprised Minnesota, defeating them 12–6. The Sharks recorded two touchdown passes by quarterback Val Halesworth. One score was on a long pass to Natalie Jufer that led to a 71-yard touchdown. The other score was an 18-yard pass to Valerie Monaco.

Independent Women's Football League
The Sharks played their home games at the Aviator Sports Complex at Floyd Bennett Field in Brooklyn, New York.  They played an 8-game regular season schedule.

Future
From 2014 to 2015, the Sharks played in the Independent Women's Football League. From 2016–2018, the Sharks were a member team in the Women's Football Alliance (WFA).  In 2018 the team was sold and became the New York Wolves.

Season-By-Season
(not including Long Island Sharks flag football seasons)

|-
| colspan="6" align="center" | New York Sharks (No Limits Barnstorming)
|-
|1999 || 1 || 0 || 0 || -- || Won Exhibition Game (Minnesota)
|-
| colspan="6" align="center" | New York Sharks (WPFL)
|-
|2000 || 4 || 2 || 0 || 2nd NC East || Lost National Conference Qualifier (New England)
|-
| colspan="6" align="center" | New York Sharks (Independent)
|-
|2001 || 6 || 1 || 0 || -- || --
|-
| colspan="6" align="center" | New York Sharks (IWFL)
|-
|2002 || 7 || 0 || 0 || 1st East || Won IWFL Championship (Austin)
|-
|2003 || 8 || 0 || 0 || 1st EC Mid Atlantic || Won Eastern Conference Championship (Bay State)Lost IWFL Championship (Sacramento)
|-
|2004 || 8 || 0 || 0 || 1st EC Mid Atlantic || Won Eastern Conference Wildcard (Chicago)Won Eastern Conference Championship (Tampa Bay)Lost IWFL Championship (Sacramento)
|-
|2005 || 10 || 0 || 0 || 1st EC Mid Atlantic || Won Eastern Conference Wildcard (Southern Maine)Lost Eastern Conference Championship (Atlanta)
|-
|2006 || 8 || 0 || 0 || 1st EC Mid Atlantic || Won Eastern Conference Wildcard (Miami)Lost Eastern Conference Championship (Atlanta)
|-
|2007 || 6 || 2 || 0 || 1st EC North Atlantic || Won Eastern Conference Wildcard (Manchester)Lost Eastern Conference Championship (Atlanta)
|-
|2008 || 6 || 2 || 0 || 2nd Tier I EC North Atlantic || --
|-
|2009 || 4 || 4 || 0 || 3rd Tier I EC North Atlantic || --
|-
|2010 || 7 || 1 || 0 || 2nd Tier I EC Northeast || Lost Northeast Division Championship (Boston)
|-
| colspan="6" align="center" | New York Sharks (WFA)
|-
|2011 || 5 || 3 || 0 || 2nd NC North || --
|-
|2012 || 4 || 4 || 0 || 2nd NC Division 2 ||  Won National Conference Wildcard (Keystone)Lost National Conference Quarterfinal (Boston)
|-
!Totals || 92 || 27 || 0
|colspan="2"| (including playoffs)

* = current standing

2012 roster

2009

Season schedule

2010

Season schedule

2011

Standings

Season schedule

2012

Standings

Season schedule

** = Won by forfeit

External links
 

Women's Football Alliance teams
American football teams in New York City
American football teams established in 1999
1999 establishments in New York City
Women in New York City
Women's sports in New York (state)